The 2005 FIA GT Istanbul 2 Hours was the eighth race for the 2005 FIA GT Championship season.  It took place on 18 September 2005 at Istanbul Park.

Official results

Class winners in bold.  Cars failing to complete 70% of winner's distance marked as Not Classified (NC).

Statistics
 Pole Position – #2 GPC Sport – 1:49.611
 Fastest Lap – #10 Vitaphone Racing Team – 1:50.949
 Average Speed – 157.30 km/h

External links
 Official Results
 Race results

I
2005 in Turkish motorsport